Bretea may refer to:

 Bretea, a village in the Șieu-Odorhei commune in Bistriţa-Năsăud County, Romania
 Bretea River, a tributary of the Şieu River in Romania
 Bretea Română, a commune in Hunedoara County, Romania
 Bretea Streiului, a village in the Bretea Română commune, Romania
 Bretea Mureșană, a village in the Ilia, Hunedoara commune, Romania